Abdulayev (masculine) or Abdulayeva (feminine) is a surname in Russian, Caucasian, and Central Asian languages. 

Variants of this surname include Abdalin/Abdalina (/), Abdulin/Abdulina (/), Abdullayev/Abdullayeva (/), Abdullin/Abdullina (/), Abdulov/Abdulova (/), Babdulin/Babdulina (/), and Babdullin/Babdullina (/). All these surnames slavicised from various forms of the given name Abdullah (Abdulla), which itself is derived from Arabic "abd allāh", meaning god's servant or god's slave.

People with the name Abdulayev include:
Eldar Abdulayev (born 1985), Kazakhstani ice-hockey player
Guerman Abdulaev (Abdulayev), Russian judoka
Omar Abdulayev (born 1978), Tajikistani GITMO detainee

See also 
 Ahmad Afandi Abdulaev (born 1959), Dagestani Mufti, Chairman of the Dagestani Council of Alims.
Variants

 Abdulov
 Abdulin
 Abdullayev
 Abdullin
 Abdulov

References

Notes

Sources
И. М. Ганжина (I. M. Ganzhina). "Словарь современных русских фамилий" (Dictionary of Modern Russian Last Names). Москва, 2001. 



Azerbaijani-language surnames
Kazakh-language surnames
Kyrgyz-language surnames
Russian-language surnames
Tajik-language surnames
Turkmen-language surnames
Uzbek-language surnames
Chechen-language surnames
Patronymic surnames
Surnames from given names